Robin Drysdale (born 18 September 1952) is a former professional tennis player from Great Britain.  

A native of Dedham, Essex, Drysdale is well known for being a quarterfinalist at the December edition of the 1977 Australian Open.

Career finals

Singles (1 runner-up)

Doubles (1 title, 2 runner-ups)

References

External links
 
 

1952 births
Living people
English male tennis players
People from Dedham, Essex
People from Fulham
British male tennis players
Tennis people from Essex